Samuel Halsall (born 18 August 2001) is an English professional rugby league footballer who plays as a  or er for the Huddersfield Giants in the Betfred Super League.

He previously played for the Wigan Warriors in the Super League and has spent time on loan from Wigan at the Newcastle Thunder in the Betfred Championship.

Background
Halsall played his amateur rugby league for the Shevington Sharks ARLFC.

Career

2020
Halsall made his Super League debut in round 14 of the 2020 Super League season for the Warriors against St Helens where Wigan went on to lose 42–0 against a much more experienced St Helens squad.

Newcastle Thunder
On 4 Jun 2021 it was reported that he had signed for the Newcastle Thunder in the RFL Championship on loan.

Huddersfield Giants
In October 2022 Halsall signed for the Huddersfield Giants on a three-year deal.

References

External links
Wigan Warriors profile

2001 births
Living people
English rugby league players
Huddersfield Giants players
Newcastle Thunder players
Rugby league centres
Rugby league players from Lancashire
Rugby league wingers
Wigan Warriors players